Parliamentary elections were held in Greece on 25 February 1872. Supporters of Alexandros Koumoundouros and Dimitrios Voulgaris both won 65 seats of the 190 seats. Voulgaris remained Prime Minister until 20 July, when he was replaced by Epameinondas Deligiorgis.

Results

References

Greece
Parliamentary elections in Greece
1872 in Greece
Greece
1870s in Greek politics